The McGill University Life Sciences Research Complex (MULSRC) or simply the McGill Life Sciences Complex is a collaborative effort between McGill's Faculty of Science, Faculty of Medicine and Health Sciences and the McGill University Health Centre to create a multi-disciplinary research environment for investigators in the life sciences.  The complex brings scientists together to work on research projects within five thematic biomedical fields:
 Cancer
 Genetics of complex traits
 Chemical biology
 Developmental and reproductive biology
 Cell information systems

Buildings
The Life Sciences Complex is located within three interconnected buildings on the McGill campus in downtown Montreal:
McIntyre Medical Sciences Building, 3655 Promenade Sir William Osler
 Stewart Biological Sciences Building, 1205 Dr Penfield Avenue
Bellini Building and Cancer Pavilion

Stewart Biology Building underwent extensive renovations starting in 2017 in order to modernize its facilities.

References

External links
McGill Life Sciences Complex

McGill University